HNK Trogir  is a Croatian football club, based in town of Trogir on the Croatian coast. Trogir plays home matches at Igralište Batarija.

History 

HNK Trogir  was founded in 1912. In 2009 the club fell into financial difficulties and resigned from the Treća HNL – South after only 7 matches.

Honours 

 1.ŽNL – S-D:
Winners (1): 2004–05

 Treća HNL – South:
Winners (1): 2006–07

Recent seasons

Key

P = Played
W = Games won
D = Games drawn
L = Games lost
F = Goals for
A = Goals against
Pts = Points
Pos = Final position

2. HNL = Croatian Second League
3. HNL = Croatian Third League
1. ŽNL = First County League
2. ŽNL = Second County League
S-D = Split-Dalmatia

R1 = Round 1
R2 = Round 2
QF = Quarter-finals
SF = Semi-finals
RU = Runners-up
W  = Winners

External links 

 

 
Football clubs in Croatia
Football clubs in Split-Dalmatia County
Association football clubs established in 1912
1912 establishments in Croatia
Fan-owned football clubs